These are the results of the women's doubles competition, one of two events for female competitors in table tennis at the 2000 Summer Olympics in Sydney.

Among 34 entries, eight seeded pairs were allocated into the draw of knockout stage which started from the round of 16. The rest 26 pairs were reduced to 24 pairs by two knockout matches. 24 pairs competed in eight groups of three pairs per group. Winners of each group advanced to the knockout stage.

Seeds
  (champions, gold medalists)
  (final, silver medalists)
  (first round)
  (semifinals, fourth place)
  (semifinals, bronze medalists)
  (quarterfinals)
  (first round)
  (first round)

Qualification round
The winners of each qualification match advanced to the group stage.

Group stage

Group A

Group B

Group C

Group D

Group E

Group F

Group G

Group H

Knockout stage

Competitors

References

External links
 Table Tennis. Official Report of the XXVII Olympiad - Results. Digitally published by the LA84 Foundation.
 2000 Summer Olympics / Table Tennis / Doubles, Women. Olympedia.

Table tennis at the 2000 Summer Olympics
Oly
Women's events at the 2000 Summer Olympics